Balapan  ( - pipsqueak, chick) is a Kazakh children's TV channel.

History 
Balapan began streaming on TV on September 27, 2010. It is part of the RTRC JSC "Kazakhstan". On September 3, 2012, broadcasts moved into a new media center "Qazmedia ortalyğy" in Astana. The station broadcasts 17 hours a day in Kazakh in the SD format. Broadcast hours are 07:00 - 00:00 AM.

Programs 

 «Ол кім? Бұл не!»
 «Шарайна»
 «Күлегеш»
 «Сен білесің бе?»
 «Он саусақ»
 «Санжар мен Қайсар»
 «Жолың болсың, балақай!»
 «Дәрумен»
 «Бала тілі — бал»
 «Кәсібің-нәсібің!»
 «Зерде»
 «Жүзден жүйрік»
 «Бауырсақ»
 «Hello, балапан!» (Hello, balapan!)
 «Санамақ»
 «Айжұлдыз»

Cartoons 

 «Балдырған»
 «Алдар Көсе»
 «Ғажайыпстанға саяхат»
 «Қанатты барыс»
 «Раф және оның достары»
 «Манон»
 «Ерекше қыз»
 «Чиро»
 «Поппестаун» (Poppets Town)
 «Еріншектер елі» http://balapan.kaztrk.kz/projects/mults/

References

External links

2010 establishments in Kazakhstan
Kazakh language
Children's television networks
Television stations in Kazakhstan
Television channels and stations established in 2010